The 1974 Arkansas gubernatorial election was held on November 5, 1974.

Incumbent Democratic Governor Dale Bumpers retired to run for the U.S. Senate.

Democratic nominee David Pryor defeated Republican nominee Ken Coon with 65.57% of the vote.

Primary elections
Primary elections were held on May 28, 1974.

Democratic primary

Candidates
Orval E. Faubus, former Governor
David Pryor, former U.S. Representative for the 4th district
Bob C. Riley, incumbent Lieutenant Governor

Results

Republican primary

Candidates
Ken Coon, executive director of the Republican Party of Arkansas
Joseph H. Weston, editor of the Sharp Citizen

Results

General election

Candidates
David Pryor, Democratic
Ken Coon, Republican

Results

References

Bibliography
 
 
 

1974
Arkansas
Gubernatorial
November 1974 events in the United States